Aditya Bhattacharya (born 1965) is an Indian film director and screenwriter, most known for his feature film, Raakh (1989), starring Aamir Khan and Pankaj Kapur, which garnered three National Film Awards.

He is the son of film director Basu Bhattacharya and Rinki Bhattacharya, the daughter of Bimal Roy.

Early life
Born in a Bengali family of film director Basu Bhattacharya and Rinki Bhattacharya, who is daughter of noted filmmaker Bimal Roy and herself a  columnist and documentary filmmaker. He has two sisters, Chimmu and Anwesha Arya, who is a writer.

Career
He started his film career as an actor in Shyam Benegal's Mandi (1983), where he played the role of Smita Patil's boyfriend.  He followed it up Rihaee (1988) and Sudhir Mishra's Hazaaron Khwaishein Aisi (2003). He made his debut as director with Raakh (1989), which starred Aamir Khan, his second after his debut with Ketan Mehta's Holi (1984), though it was released only after his blockbuster QSQT (1989); the film didn't do well at the box office; however, it went on to receive three National Film Awards, and a Best Directorial Debut Award  at the Bengal Film Journalists' Association Awards.

Meanwhile, he also worked as a photo journalist. Subsequently, he shifted base in 1988 from Mumbai to Rome, where he made an Italian film, some music videos, etc.

His film Dubai Return (2005), which he also produced under the banner Aditya Pictures, starred Irrfan Khan and Divya Dutta, which premiered at IFFI Goa 2005.

In 2012, he produced and directed  Bombay's Most Wanted (BMW), a film on encounter specialist played by Javed Jaffrey. BMW was screened at the Mumbai Film Festival, organised by MAMI. It is expected to have a commercial release all over India in early 2013.

Personal life
He was in a relationship with actress and theatre person Sanjana Kapoor for many years, whom he had met during the theatre days at Prithvi Theatre, and later married, but the marriage didn't last.  Presently, he is married to an Italian, Maria Giovanna and divides his time between Sicily and Mumbai.

Filmography
 Director
 Raakh (1989)
 Senso Unico (1999)
 Dubai Return (2005)
 Sandokan in Sicilia (2009)
 BMW - Bombay's Most Wanted (2012)

Actor
 Mandi (1983)
 Rihaee (1988)
 Hazaaron Khwaishein Aisi (2003)
 Black Friday (2004)
 Tera Kya Hoga Johnny (2008)

References

External links
 

Film directors from Mumbai
1965 births
Living people
Bengali Hindus
Hindi-language film directors
Indian male screenwriters
Male actors from Mumbai
Place of birth missing (living people)
Male actors in Hindi cinema
Indian male film actors
20th-century Indian male actors
21st-century Indian male actors